Obianuju is a Nigerian name of Igbo origin. It means “born in the midst of plenty”.

Notable people with the name 

 Obianuju Catherine Udeh professionally known as DJ Switch
 Catherine Obianuju Acholonu, Nigerian writer
 Obianuju Ekeocha, Nigerian biomedical scientist

References 

Nigerian names